Jayashri is an Indian given name and surname. Notable people with the name include:

Bombay Jayashri, Indian musician
Jayashri Raiji (1895–1985), Indian independence activist, social worker, reformist, and politician

See also
Jayashree

Indian surnames